Matti Klinge (31 August 1936 – 5 March 2023) was a Finnish historian.

Klinge studied at the University of Helsinki and gained his Ph.D. in 1969. He later served as a Visiting Professor at the University of Paris (1970–1972) and held the Swedish Professorship of History at the University of Helsinki between 1975 and 2001. Klinge was one of the most prolific Finnish historians.

Kligne died in March 2023, at the age of 86.

References

See also
 

1936 births
2023 deaths
20th-century Finnish historians
Academic staff of the University of Helsinki
Academic staff of the University of Paris
Recipients of the Legion of Honour
Finnish people of Baltic German descent